Marcelo Demoliner and Santiago González were the defending champions, but chose not to participate together. Demoliner played alongside Divij Sharan, but lost in the quarterfinals to Denys Molchanov and Igor Zelenay. González teamed up with Aisam-ul-Haq Qureshi, but lost in the first round to Ivan Dodig and Filip Polášek.

Jonathan Erlich and Artem Sitak won the title, defeating Dodig and Polášek in the final, 6–3, 6–4.

Seeds

Draw

Draw

References
 Main Draw

Antalya Open - Doubles
2019 Doubles